Ballsh is a town and a former municipality in Fier County, southern Albania. At the 2015 local government reform it became a subdivision and the seat of the municipality Mallakastër. It was the seat of the former District of Mallakastër. The population at the 2011 census was 7,657.

Name
It was centre of Malkasra (Turkish of "Mallakastër") kaza in Sanjak of Berat in Yanya Vilayet during Ottoman rule between 1670 and 1912. Its name evolved from the name of the ancient town Byllis, located in proximity of Ballsh. Church sources report the variants Byllis, Bellis, Ballis and Vallis.

History

Ballsh is close to the ancient city of Byllis, a city during the Illyria era. The Slavic invasions of the 6th and 7th centuries caused the decline of Byllis while Ballsh was built with materials plundered from Byllis..

Economy
The city's surrounding fields are rich in crude petroleum and are dotted by a series of oil wells established during the communist dictatorship. Only a fraction of these wells are operating today, but the city includes a working refinery, and outputs of naphthas are significant.

The refinery was owned by Taçi Oil through ARMO (Anika Mercuria Refinery Associated Oil, owned by Anika Enterprises). In 2013 ARMO was sold to Heaney Assets Corporation, an Azerbaijan corporation.

Sports
The city's team KS Bylis Ballsh, plays at the Adush Muça Stadium.

See also
Ballshi inscription
Epitaph of Gllavenica

References

Former municipalities in Fier County
Administrative units of Mallakastër
Towns in Albania